Beaumont-Pied-de-Bœuf is a commune in the Mayenne department in northwestern France.

Geography
The Vaige forms part of the commune's northwestern border, flows southeast through the middle of the commune, and forms part of its southeastern border.

Population

See also
Communes of Mayenne

References

Communes of Mayenne